Steve Enloe Wylie (May 7, 1911 – October 23, 1993) was an American baseball pitcher in the Negro leagues. He played from 1944 to 1947 with the Memphis Red Sox  and the Kansas City Monarchs.

References

External links
 and Seamheads

1911 births
1993 deaths
Kansas City Monarchs players
Memphis Red Sox players
Baseball players from Arkansas
20th-century African-American sportspeople
Baseball pitchers